The Cobra Killer duo of Gina V. D'Orio and Annika Trost began as part of Alec Empire's Digital hardcore movement. Both were part of other bands signed to Empire's Digital Hardcore Recordings label—D'Orio was in EC8OR, and Trost was in Shizuo.

When Empire's label cut back on its bands, many of the DHR groups folded, but D'Orio and Trost kept going. They have released four albums and are currently on the Monika Enterprise label. Cobra Killer played with Sonic Youth and collaborates with many international artists. Peaches played her first gig as support act of Cobra Killer in Berlin.

Discography

Albums
Cobra Killer (1998) 
The Third Armpit (2002)
76/77 (2004) 
Das Mandolinenorchester (2005) 
Uppers & Downers (2009)

Singles
"Right Into A Kick For More" (7") (1998)
"Heavy Rotation" (10") (2002)
"Heavy Rotation" (The Grossraumdiskomixes) (12") (2005)
"Das Mandolinenorchester" (2005)

References

External links
Cobra Killer website

Electronic music duos
German electronic music groups
All-female bands
Digital hardcore music groups
Women in electronic music
German musical duos
Female musical duos